Agama kirkii, Kirk's rock agama, is a species of lizard in the family Agamidae. It is a small lizard found in Malawi, Zambia, Zimbabwe, Mozambique, Botswana, and Tanzania.

References

Agama (genus)
Reptiles described in 1885
Taxa named by George Albert Boulenger